The White Nunataks are three nunataks standing 3 nautical miles (6 km) north of the northwest tip of Mackin Table in the Patuxent Range of the Pensacola Mountains in Antarctica.  They were mapped by the United States Geological Survey (USGS) from surveys and U.S. Navy air photos taken between 1959 and 1966. They were named by the Advisory Committee on Antarctic Names (US-ACAN) for Noah D. White, a radioman at the South Pole Station over the winter of 1967.

References 

Nunataks of Queen Elizabeth Land